The 1939 Washington Huskies football team was an American football team that represented the University of Washington during the 1939 college football season. In its tenth season under head coach Jimmy Phelan, the team compiled a 4–5 record, finished in sixth place in the Pacific Coast Conference, and was outscored by its opponents by a combined total of 93 to 77. Chuck Bechtol was the team captain.

Schedule

NFL Draft selections
One University of Washington Husky was selected in the 1940 NFL Draft, which lasted 22 rounds with 200 selections.

References

Washington
Washington Huskies football seasons
Washington Huskies football